Having been ruled by several countries over the centuries, Milanese culture is eclectic and borrows elements from many other countries, including Austria, Spain and France. Similarities between these places and Milan can be noticed through the language, architecture, cuisine and general culture of these countries.

In the 18th century, Austrian rule stimulated much of the city's cultural, political, social and economic life, resulting in the founding of numerous important artistic institutions, as well as contributing to the city's architecture. After the unification of Italy in 1861, Milan became a major industrial and cultural centre in the new Kingdom; in the late 19th century onwards, the city held the position of the country's economic capital, whilst Rome was the seat of the government, making it the country's main political and administrative hub. In the fin-de-siècle period and the early 20th century, the city became an important architectural centre (highly influenced by Art Nouveau, additionally highlighted by the 1906 World Exposition, which was held in the city), and remained a prominent city with regard to a major intellectual scene.

After World War II, Milan was highly affected by the Italian economic miracle, or il boom, and attracted a wave of immigrants from Southern Italy, who sought work in the prosperous city. By then an important centre for finance and design, the metropolis grew into a major fashion capital in the 1980s. In the 2000s Milan still remains one of the country's most important cultural, media and economic centres; its prominence is extended worldwide, and it is recognised as an Alpha global city. The city additionally hosted the Expo 2015. Milan is traditionally referred to as the moral capital of Italy, especially due to the city's perceived work ethic.

Milan today is an international city, with numerous museums and cultural icons. Such include the Duomo di Milano (Milan Cathedral), the Castello Sforzesco, the Galleria Vittorio Emanuele II and the Teatro alla Scala, to name but a few. The city has been home to numerous renowned people in history, such as Giuseppe Verdi, Mario Prada, Caravaggio, Enzo Biagi and Bramante.

Language

In addition to Italian, approximately a third of the population of western Lombardy can speak the Western Lombard language, also known as Insubric. In Milan, some natives of the city can speak the traditional Milanese language—that is to say the urban variety of Western Lombard, which is not to be confused with the Milanese-influenced regional variety of the Italian language.

In Italian-speaking contexts, Milanese is (like the other non-Italian language varieties spoken within the borders of the Italian Republic) generically called a "dialect". This is often incorrectly understood to mean a dialect of Italian, which actually is not the case. Milanese and Italian are distinct Romance languages and are not mutually intelligible. Milanese is  Western Lombard variety and is intelligible to speakers of other neighbouring Western Lombard varieties. It should not be confused with the Milanese dialect of Italian, or with Western Lombard as a whole, which is sometimes referred to as "Milanese".

Like other dialects of Western Lombard, Milanese is a Romance language, related to French, Romansh, and Italian.

Dictionaries, grammar books, literature and a recent translation of the Gospels are available in Milanese.

People

Throughout history, Milan has boasted numerous people of great influence who came from or resided in the city. Renowned Milanese artists include Caravaggio, Bramante, Bramantino and Francesco Hayez. Well-known historical figures include Saint Charles Borromeo, Saint Ambrose, Saint Augustine, Beatrice d'Este and Ludovico Sforza. Milanese politicians include Silvio Berlusconi, Letizia Moratti and Bettino Craxi. The major composers, musicians and literary figures from Milan are people such as Alessandro Manzoni, Mina and Giuseppe Verdi, and fashion designers and people of the media include Giorgio Armani, Mario Prada and Mike Bongiorno.

Architecture

Roman and early Christian monuments

Few significant works of art have survived from the Roman era in Lombardy and the adjacent areas. Though the Roman Empire played an important role in the city's administration, artifacts of the Great Migrations and the Roman Germanic invasions were largely destroyed. In recent decades, there has been archaeological research concerning a number of ancient structures found under the city: city walls, the ruins of the product, and the ruins of the amphitheatre.

More remains of the culture of late Roman Empire, but they have actually been considered the products of early Christian art. This is the age in which Ambrose was bishop of Milan. The Basilica of Sant'Ambrogio stands today, although most come from later periods of use, but it is fundamentally a prototype for early Christian churches. Similarly, the effects of the Byzantine Empire can be observed in the architecture of the Basilica of San Lorenzo.

Romanesque and Gothic

Over the centuries, when the Romanesque and the Gothic style spread throughout Europe and Italy, Lombardy was a leading location of the style. Thus, the Lombard style of Romanesque art was created. The style was mainly diffused in Milan, Pavia, Cremona and other major cities. Milan introduced the cross-shaped basilica, having two stems form an integral unit as in the Basilica of Sant'Ambrogio.

The Lombard style held a greater role in further development of the building structure from the vault, with the pillars and columns. This trend was strongly influenced by the development of Romanesque architecture in Europe. Very typical of this style is the square bell-tower, such as in the San Satiro. The town halls and civic spirit of Lombardy style houses were built. These features of the structural elements for decoration highlight the abundant plant and animal motifs.

The local architecture has gained importance in the era of Romanesque and Gothic sculptures and Lombard frescos as well.

Gothic, the 12th-century architectural style, also established itself in Lombardy. A notable example is the Chiaravalle Abbey. Gothic architecture borrowed elements from the Romanesque structure, which remained the same, but the openings were wider.

Renaissance

The first of the early Renaissance works in the city include the San Eustorgio Church. Sculptural works of this era, however, are still ornaments of the city, not only from Milan's artists, but also from those of Tuscany, Venice, Burgundy, Austria and Germany. They were invited to the city by the local princes and nobles. So Milan has, inter alia, Leonardo da Vinci and Bramante. Bramante created for Milan, among others, the Santa Maria delle Grazie church and the cupola. His students in Milan, Bergamo and Como helped to spread the Renaissance style.

Baroque

Lombard art in the Baroque age of high standard once again increased, particularly in the field of architecture. The Baroque era in Italy is said to have begun in 1573 with the Council of Trent. Alessi Tibaldi, Giuseppe Meda and others in Milan created religious and secular buildings of artistic value (Palazzo Marino, Palazzo dell'Ambrosiana, Ospedale Maggiore).

19th-century art
18th-century architecture in Milan was very different from architecture in other Italian cities, such as Tuscany and Venice. Works by Giuseppe Piermarini, including the Palazzo Belgioioso or La Scala opera house belong to the Neoclassical period. Lombardy's most outstanding sculptors of the age were Luigi Cagnola and Luigi Pollak. Francesco Hayez was an example of a major Milanese artist of the period.

20th-century art
During the 20th century, Milan was one of the main centers of Italian futurism and a few major artists such as Gino Severini, Giacomo Balla, Umberto Boccioni resided or worked there. Mussolini, like in several Italian cities, also launched a grandiose building project in Milan, such as the central railway station building. After the disastrous bombardments of World War II there followed a period of rapid reconstruction, and modern office buildings adjacent to the medieval cathedrals were built, such as the Torre Velasca. Milan is famous for being home of the Pirelli Tower, which is one of Europe's oldest skyscrapers.

San Siro Stables
San Siro Stables, also known as Scuderie De Montel were built between 1914 and 1924 by De Montel, a Jewish Milanese aristocrat. In 1938 following the application of racial laws in Italy the government took possession of the buildings.
In 2006 there was a proposal to build a thermal bath over the area, but the City Council of Milan canceled the project due to lack of funds.

Main sights

Milan is one of the major artistic centres of northern Italy. Its chief landmarks include:
 The Duomo, the world's largest collection of marble statues with the widely visible golden Madonna statue on top of the spire, la Madunina (little Madonna), the symbol of Milan.
 Teatro alla Scala. Milan is also one of the most important centres in the world for Opera lirica, with its famous Teatro alla Scala (La Scala).
 The Galleria Vittorio Emanuele II, a large, covered arcade linking the Duomo's piazza with the Teatro alla Scala.
 The Castello Sforzesco and the Parco Sempione.
 The Basilica of Sant'Ambrogio
 The Palaeo-Christian Basilica of San Lorenzo
 The Biblioteca Ambrosiana, containing drawings and notebooks by Leonardo da Vinci among its vast holdings of books, manuscripts, and drawings, and is one of the main repositories of European culture. The city is also the home of the Brera Academy of Fine Arts.
 The church of Santa Maria delle Grazie, which houses one of the most famous paintings of Leonardo da Vinci, The Last Supper (L'ultima cena or Il cenacolo).
 The church of Santa Maria presso San Satiro, with a famous trompe-l'œil traditionally ascribed to Bramante
 The Cimitero Monumentale di Milano.
 The Pinacoteca di Brera, Pinacoteca Ambrosiana, Poldi Pezzoli, the Bagatti Valsecchi Museum and the Musei del Castello galleries, which host a great number of pictorial masterpieces.

Education

Milan is home to numerous universities and other institutions of higher learning:

State universities
 Università degli Studi di Milano Faculties: Agriculture, Arts and Philosophy, Law, Mathematical-Physical-Natural Sciences, Medicine and Surgery, Pharmacy, Political Science, Sport and Exercise Science, Veterinary Medicine
 University of Milan Bicocca Faculties: Economics; Educational Science; Law; Mathematics, Physics and Natural Sciences; Medicine and Surgery; Psychology; Sociology; Statistical Sciences

Science and medical
 Vita-Salute San Raffaele University
 Tethys Research Institute

Architecture and engineering
 Politecnico di Milano Statal University - 17 Departments

Business, economic and social
 Bocconi University
 Scuola Superiore di Direzione Aziendale–Bocconi
 Università Cattolica del Sacro Cuore

Language, art and music
 Accademia d’Arti e Mestieri dello Spettacolo alla Scala
 Brera Academy Academy of Fine Arts of Brera
 Università I.U.L.M.
 Nuova Accademia di Belle Arti Milano - NABA
 Conservatorio Superiore "G. Verdi" di Milano
 Civica Scuola di Musica (Municipal Music School)
 Scuola Beato Angelico

Actor and theatre schools
 Scuole Civiche di Milano Politecnico della Cultura, delle Arti e delle Lingue
 Piccolo Teatro di Milano
 Accademia dei Filodrammatici

Fashion and design
 Domus Academy, Postgraduate School of Design
 Istituto Europeo di Design
 Istituto Marangoni
 Politecnico di Milano - Facoltà del Design
 SPD Scuola Politecnica Di Design

Literature

In the late eighteenth century, and throughout the nineteenth century, Milan was an important centre for intellectual discussion and literary creativity. The Enlightenment found here a fertile ground. Cesare Beccaria, with his famous Dei delitti e delle pene, and Pietro Verri, with the periodical Il Caffè were able to exert a considerable influence over the new middle-class culture, thanks also to an open-minded Austrian administration. In the first years of the nineteenth century, the ideals of the Romantic movement made their impact on the cultural life of the city and its major writers debated the primacy of Classical versus Romantic poetry. Here, too, Giuseppe Parini, and Ugo Foscolo published their most important works, and were admired by younger poets as masters of ethics, as well as of literary craftsmanship. Foscolo's poem Dei sepolcri was inspired by a Napoleonic law which—against the will of many of its inhabitants—was being extended to the city.

In the third decade of the 19th century, Alessandro Manzoni wrote his novel I Promessi Sposi, considered the manifesto of Italian Romanticism, which found in Milan its centre. The periodical Il Conciliatore published articles by Silvio Pellico, Giovanni Berchet, Ludovico di Breme, who were both Romantic in poetry and patriotic in politics.

After the Unification of Italy in 1861, Milan lost its political importance; nevertheless it retained a sort of central position in cultural debates. New ideas and movements from other countries of Europe were accepted and discussed: thus Realism and Naturalism gave birth to an Italian movement, Verismo. The greatest verista novelist, Giovanni Verga, was born in Sicily but wrote his most important books in Milan.

Music and performing arts

Milan is a major nationwide and international centre of the performing arts, most notably opera.  Milan is the location of La Scala opera house, one of the most prestigious opera houses in the world, and throughout history has hosted the premieres of numerous operas, such as Nabucco by Giuseppe Verdi in 1842, La Gioconda by Amilcare Ponchielli, Madama Butterfly by Giacomo Puccini in 1904, Turandot by Giacomo Puccini in 1926, and more recently Teneke, by Fabio Vacchi in 2007, to name but a few. Other major theatres in Milan include the Teatro degli Arcimboldi, Teatro Dal Verme, Teatro Lirico (Milan) and the Teatro Regio Ducale. The city also has a renowned symphony orchestra and musical conservatory, and has been, throughout history, a major centre for musical composition: numerous famous composers and musicians such as Gioseppe Caimo, Simon Boyleau, Hoste da Reggio, Verdi, Giulio Gatti-Casazza, Paolo Cherici and Alice Edun are or were from, or call or called Milan their home. The city has also formed numerous modern ensembles and bands, such as the Dynamis Ensemble, Stormy Six and the Camerata Mediolanense have been formed.

Science

Milan has for a long time been an important national and European scientific centre. As one of the early-industrialised Italian cities, modern science in the Milan developed in the late-19th century and the early-20th century, when the city became one of the so-called "laboratory cities", along with Brussels, London, Paris and other major economic and industrial centres on the continent. Following serious competition from the neighbouring scientific atheneum of Pavia (where Albert Einstein spent some of his study years), Milan started to develop an advanced technological and scientific sector, and began to found numerous academies and institutions. Milan will host an interesting project called "Milano, City of Science" (Milano, Città delle Scienze in Italian), which will be held in the International Exhibition of Sempione. Science-related events which also occurred in Milan was the European Union Contest for Young Scientists, held in the city on 13 September 1997 at the Science Fair in the Fondazione Stelline. Probably the most important and ancient observatory in Milan is the Brera Astronomical Observatory, which was founded by the Jesuits in 1764, and was run by government ever since a law was passed in 1785.

Fashion

In 2009, Milan was regarded as the world fashion capital, even surpassing New York, Paris, Rome and London. Most of the major Italian fashion brands, such as Valentino, Gucci, Versace, Prada, Armani and Dolce & Gabbana (to name a few), are currently headquartered in the city. Numerous international fashion labels also operate shops in Milan, including an Abercrombie & Fitch flagship store which has become a main consumer attraction. Milan also hosts a fashion week twice a year, just like other international centres such as Paris, London, Tokyo, New York, Los Angeles and Rome. Milan's main upscale shopping streets and centres are the Via Montenapoleone fashion district and the Galleria Vittorio Emanuele, off Piazza del Duomo. Mario Prada, founder of Prada was even born here, helping to cultivate its position as a world fashion capital.

Design
Milan is one of the international capitals of industrial and modern design, and is regarded as one of the world's most influential cities in such fields. The city is particularly well known for its high-quality ancient and modern furniture and industrial goods. Milan hosts the FieraMilano, Europe's biggest, and one of the world's most prestigious furniture and design fairs. Milan also hosts major design and architecture-related events and venues, such as the "Fuori Salone" and the "Salone del Mobile".

In the 1950s and 60s, being the main industrial centre of Italy and one of mainland Europe's most progressive and dynamic cities, Milan became, along with Turin, Italy's capital of post-war design and architecture. Skyscrapers, such as the Pirelli Tower and the Torre Velasca were constructed, and architects such as Bruno Munari, Lucio Fontana, Enrico Castellani and Piero Manzoni, to name a few, either lived or worked in the city.

Media
Milan is the base of operations for many local and nationwide communication services and businesses, such as newspapers, magazines, and television and radio stations.

Newspapers

 Corriere della Sera
 Il Foglio
 Il Giornale
 Il Giorno
 Il Sole 24 Ore
 Il Manifesto
 La Gazzetta dello Sport
 La Padania
 Libero
 MF Milano Finanza

Magazines

 La Settimana Enigmistica
 Abitare (architecture and design monthly)
 Casabella (architecture and design monthly)
 Domus (architecture and design monthly)
 Panorama (weekly)
 Gente (weekly)

Radio stations

 R101
 RTL 102.5
 Radio 105 Network
 Virgin Radio Italia
 Radio Monte Carlo
 Radio 24
 Radio DeeJay
 Radio Classica

Nightlife

Milan is a renowned city in Europe for its nightlife. The city is particularly well known for its c. 6pm "Happy Hour" - that is, a time in which hotels, restaurants and clubs are filled with people attending them for an aperitif (aperitivo), which is usually a light snack and a drink, after which, the traditional Italian "passegiata" is held, which is a social event in which some people promenade the streets, chatting with friends or window shopping. The "Milanese nightlife" spans from about 11 o'clock until 4 in the morning, and is usually held in the city's plethora of discothèques, clubs, restaurants and jazz venues. The most popular nightlife areas include the Brera district, where several modern nightclubs and bars can be found, the area around the Navigli, once the city's old industrial canals, but today a youthful nightlife area and the famous Leoncavallo, just near to the Porta Ticinese. Apart from the specifically designed nightclubs and discos, the Centri sociali, or social centres, are very popular with adolescents, since they are relatively inexpensive, and host a variety of entertainment activities, from heavy rock music, to light 1960s pop and cinematic venues. Milan's clubs and night-time musical venues are usually concentrated around jazz and rock music. Usually, nightclubs are at their busiest on Saturday evenings, and at their least (and in some cases, shut) on Mondays.

Festivity

Holidays
 March 18-March 22: Commemoration of the 1848 revolution or the five Days of Milan.
 April 25: Milan's liberation from German occupation during World War II.
 December 7: Feast of Saint Ambrose (Festa di Sant'Ambrogio).
 December 12: Commemoration of the Piazza Fontana bombings.

Events and decorations

There are several important and/or symbolic events in Milan during the year. On 6 January, there is the "Corteo dei Magi", an annual epiphany procession which goes from the church of Sant'Eustorgio all the way to the Piazza del Duomo and the city's Cathedral. Other events include the "Fiera di Senigalla", a weekly traditional fair held on Saturdays, selling different objects, such as bicycles, antiques, books and also different objects from around the world, reflecting Milan's multi-ethnic society, along the Darsena or the Brera Antique Market (Mercato dell'Antiquariato di Brera), which sells different antiquaries, jewels, local produce, furnishings or vintage objects held in the Brera district. In February, the Chinese New Year is also commonly celebrated in Milan's Chinese district, with a colourful festival. In April, Milan hosts its main design fair in the Piazza XXIV Maggio, the "Fuori Salone", and in other times of the year a prestigious fashion week twice a year, the "Milano Jazzin' Festival", in which several local and international Blues, Jazz and pop singers re-unite in the Civic Arena, and the Milan Food Week, in which the city's gastronomical history is celebrated, the Milano in Sport week, and the Milan Film Festival, held in the Piccolo Teatro on the Via Dante celebrating Italian and foreign film and motion pictures.

Christmas time is usually full of events in Milan, including the Oh Bej, Oh Bej market, one of the city's oldest selling traditional produce, objects and food. The city is renowned for its Christmas lights, which decorate the city during the Christmas period until 7 January. All the city's public buildings, streets, squares and most of the shops are decorated with traditional lights and similar decorations. In 2007, however, the Milanese complained because they believed that the public spending on Christmas lights (€1 million) was too much for what they considered were not as "designer-style" as those of Turin.

Religion

Milan's population, like that of Italy as a whole, is overwhelmingly Catholic. It is the seat of the Roman Catholic Archdiocese of Milan, and in 2004, 95.16% of the population were Roman Catholic. Other religions practised include: Orthodox Churches, Buddhism, Judaism, Islam and Protestantism.

Ambrosian rite

Milan has its own historic Catholic rite known as the Ambrosian Rite (Italian: Rito ambrosiano). It varies slightly from the typical Catholic rite (the Roman, used in all other western regions), with some differences in the liturgy and mass celebrations, and in the calendar (for example, the date for the beginning of lent is celebrated some days after the common date, so the carnival has different date). The Ambrosian rite is also practiced in other surrounding locations in Lombardy and in the Swiss canton of Ticino.

Another important difference concerns the liturgical music. The Gregorian chant was completely unused in Milan and surrounding areas, because the official one was its own Ambrosian chant, definitively established by the Council of Trent (1545–1563) and earlier than the Gregorian. To preserve this music there has developed the unique schola cantorum, a college, and an Institute called PIAMS (Pontifical Ambrosian Institute of Sacred Music), in partnership with the Pontifical Institute of Sacred Music (PIMS) in Rome.

Cuisine

Like most cities in Italy, Milan and its surrounding area has its own regional cuisine, which, as it is typical for Lombard cuisines, uses more frequently rice than pasta, and features almost no tomato. Milanese cuisine includes "cotoletta alla milanese", a breaded veal (pork and turkey can be used) cutlet pan-fried in butter. Other typical dishes are cassoeula (stewed pork rib chops and sausage with Savoy cabbage), ossobuco (stewed veal shank with a sauce called gremolata), risotto alla milanese (with saffron and beef marrow), busecca (stewed tripe with beans), and brasato (stewed beef or pork with wine and potatoes). Season-related pastries include chiacchiere (flat fritters dusted with sugar) and tortelli (fried spherical cookies) for Carnival, colomba (glazed cake shaped as a dove) for Easter, pane dei morti ("Deads' Day bread", cookies aromatized with cinnamon) for All Soul's Day and panettone for Christmas. The salame milano, a salami with a very fine grain, is widespread throughout Italy. The best known Milanese cheese is gorgonzola from the namesake town nearby, although today the major gorgonzola producers operate in Piedmont.

On addition to a unique cuisine, Milan has several world-renowned restaurants and cafés. Most of the more refined and upper-class restaurants are found in the historic centre, whilst the more traditional and popular ones are mainly located in the Brera and Navigli districts. Today, there is also a Nobu Japanese restaurant in Milan, which is located in Armani World in Via Manzoni and is regarded as being one of the trendiest restaurants in the city. One of the city's chicest cafés or pasticcerie is the Caffè Cova, an ancient Milanese coffeehouse founded in 1817 near the Teatro alla Scala, which has also opened franchises in Hong Kong. The Biffi Caffè and the Zucca in Galleria are also famous and historical ‘Caffès’ which are situated in Milan. Other restaurants in Milan include the Hotel Four Seasons restaurant, ‘La Briciola’, the Marino alla Scala and the Chandelier. Today, there is also a McDonald's fast-food restaurant in the Galleria Vittorio Emanuele II, and some new boutique-cafés, such as the Just Cavalli Café, owned by the luxury fashion goods brand Roberto Cavalli.

Cinema
Several (especially Italian) films have been set in Milan, including "Calmi Cuori Appassionati"''', "The International (2009 film)", "La mala ordina", "Milano calibro 9", "Miracle in Milan", "La notte", and "Rocco and His Brothers''".

Sports

The city hosted, among other events, the FIFA World Cup in 1934 and 1990, the UEFA European Football Championship in 1980.

Football is the most popular sport in Italy, and Milan is home to two world-famous football teams: A.C. Milan and Internazionale. The former is normally referred to as "Mìlan" (notice the stress on the first syllable, unlike the English and Milanese name of the city), the latter as "Inter".

Milan is the only city in Europe whose teams have won both the European Cup and the Intercontinental Cup. Both teams play at Giuseppe Meazza - San Siro Stadium (85,700). Many of the strongest Italian football players were born in Milan, in the surrounding metropolitan area, or in Lombardy: Valentino Mazzola, Paolo Maldini, Giuseppe Meazza, Giacinto Facchetti, Gigi Riva, Gaetano Scirea, Giuseppe Bergomi, Walter Zenga, Antonio Cabrini, Roberto Donadoni, Gianluca Vialli, Silvio Piola, Giampiero Boniperti, Gabriele Oriali, Giovanni Trapattoni and Franco Baresi as well as many others.
 The famous Monza Formula One circuit is located near the city, inside a wide park. It is one of the world's oldest car racing circuits. The capacity for the F1 races is currently around 137,000 spectators, although in the 1950s the stands could hold more than 250,000. It has hosted an F1 race nearly every year since the first year of competition, exception made of 1980.
 Olimpia Milano is a successful European basketball team. It is the most important Italian team and one of the top 5 in Europe. Olimpia play at the Forum (capacity 14,000)
 Rhinos Milano is the oldest American football team in Milan (and in Italy) and have won five Italian Super Bowls. They are one of the five foundation clubs of the AIFA (Associazione Italiana American Football), established first championship in 1981. They also are one of the seven foundation clubs of the Italian Football League.
 CUS Milano Baseball is the oldest baseball club in Milan and have won eight Italian Scudetti.
 The Amatori Rugby Milano have won 18 National Championships and are the most famous and important Rugby team in Italy.
 Different ice hockey teams from Milan have won 30 National Championships between them. The Vipers Milano have won the last 5 national championships, the Alpenliga and several Coppa Italia, and are the leaders of that sport in Italy. They play at the Agora Stadium (capacity 4,500) during the regular season, and at the Forum during playoffs
 Every year, Milan hosts the Bonfiglio Trophy Under 18 Tennis Tournament. It is the most important youth tournament in the world, and is played at the Milan Tennis Club. The central court has a capacity of 8000. Past winners include Tacchini, Jan Kodeš, Adriano Panatta, Corrado Barazzutti, Moreno, Björn Borg, Smid, Ivan Lendl, Guy Forget, Jim Courier, Goran Ivanišević, Yevgeny Kafelnikov, and Guillermo Coria.

Milan and Lombardy are candidates for the Winter Olympic Games of 2026 ("Milan-Cortina 2026").

Stadia
 Autodromo Nazionale Monza - car and motorcycle racing - 137,000
 San Siro - only football; Milan and Inter - 85,700
 Arena Civica - Athletics, Rugby, Football, American Football 30,000
 Brianteo - Athletics, Football - 18,568
 Ippodromo del Trotter - Horse Racing - 16,000
 Ippodromo del Galoppo - Horse Racing - 15,000
 Datch Forum - Basketball, Ice Hockey, Volleyball, Music - 9,000 to 12,000
 Velodromo Vigorelli - Cycling, American Football - 8,000
 PalaSharp (formerly MazdaPalace)- Basketball, Volleyball - 8,500 to 9,000
 PalaLido - Basketball - 5,000
 Agorà - Ice Hockey - 4,000
 Nuovo Giuriati - Rugby - 4,000

There are other stadiums and multiuse palaces located in the metropolitan area, the biggest being Monza Brianteo Stadium (18,000 seats), the PalaDesio (10,000) and Geas Stadium (8,500).

References